Sebastián Canovas Ávalos (born 1957 in Mexico City) is a Mexican artist known for watercolors, oil paintings and murals. He has exhibited throughout Mexico, in the United States, Canada, Switzerland, Germany and France.

Early life
Sebastián Canovas was born in Mexico City on 8 December 1957.

Studies
 Instituto Cumbres (1971–1976).
 Universidad Anáhuac (1976–1980).
 Furniture design (1981–1983)
 Water color painting under Isabel Leduc.
"Sociedad Mexicana de Acuarelistas" under Guati Rojo, Manuel Arrieta, Roberto Vargas, Demetrio Llordén, Leonard Brooks.

More recently, from 2010 through 2012, he has attended the Instituto Allende, under Philip Cusini and the Tamayo Academy in Mexico City.

Career
Sebastián Canovas obtained his Bachelor's degree in Industrial Design from Universidad Anahuac in Mexico City. He started his career as a furniture designer in his father's family business, Galerías D'Canovas.  Some customers, who saw his early work, suggested he become a full-time painter.

Sebastián has worked in various techniques, particularly watercolor.

Sebastián has had two distinct periods:
 A more classical stage, wherein he specialized in realistic watercolors that denote the contrast between transparency and opacity.  The subject matter captures the majestic Mexican countryside: beautiful landscapes and quaint towns with their native inhabitants.
 His current lyrical, spontaneous, evocative and deeply personal phase, in which the artist focuses on abstract depictions of moods, feelings and emotions, transgressing forms and colors, with veiled images filled with incognitos and conjecture. His most recent work is characterized by the use of mixed techniques and collage, experimenting with color, contrast, objects, pigments and textures that capture the audience's imagination.

Exhibitions

See also
 List of Mexican artists

References

External links
 Sebastián Canovas, official website 

1957 births
Living people
Mexican contemporary artists
Mexican painters